Gyula Szabó (20 October 1947 – 13 August 2018) was a Hungarian sports shooter. He competed at the 1972 Summer Olympics and the 1976 Summer Olympics.

References

External links
 

1947 births
2018 deaths
Hungarian male sport shooters
Olympic shooters of Hungary
Shooters at the 1972 Summer Olympics
Shooters at the 1976 Summer Olympics
Sportspeople from Heves County
20th-century Hungarian people